Nan Yunqi (Chinese: 南云齐, born 6 October 1993 in Dalian, Liaoning) is a Chinese football player who currently plays for Nantong Zhiyun in the China League One.

Club career
Nan Yunqi started his professional football career in 2011 when he was promoted to Chinese Super League side Dalian Shide. On 3 November 2012, he made his debut for Dalian Shide in the 2012 Chinese Super League against Guizhou Renhe, coming on as a substitute for Yan Xiangchuang in the 84th minute.

In 2013, Nan transferred to Dalian Aerbin after Dalian Shide dissolved. On 1 March 2013, he moved to China League One side Shenyang Shenbei on a one-year loan deal.
On 5 March 2015, Nan was loaned to China League Two side Dalian Transcendence until 31 December 2015. He transferred to Dalian Transcendence in March 2016.

In March 2017, Nan transferred to League Two side Dalian Boyoung. In March 2018, Nan signed for China League Two side Nantong Zhiyun.

Career statistics
Statistics accurate as of match played 31 December 2020.

References

External links
 

1993 births
Living people
Chinese footballers
Footballers from Dalian
Dalian Shide F.C. players
Dalian Professional F.C. players
Dalian Transcendence F.C. players
Nantong Zhiyun F.C. players
Chinese Super League players
China League One players
China League Two players
Association football forwards